Igor Olegovich Konovalov (born 8 July 1996) is a Russian professional football player. He plays as a central midfielder for Ural Yekaterinburg on loan from FC Rubin Kazan.

Club career
He made his professional debut on 31 July 2015 for FC Kuban Krasnodar in a Russian Premier League game against FC Ufa.

On 22 February 2018, he signed a long-term contract with FC Rubin Kazan.

On 12 January 2021, he was loaned to FC Arsenal Tula until the end of the 2020–21 season.

On 12 July 2021, he joined FC Akhmat Grozny on loan for the 2021–22 season.

On 17 June 2022, Konovalov was loaned to Ural Yekaterinburg for the 2022–23 season.

Career statistics

References

External links
 
 

1996 births
People from Belorechensk, Krasnodar Krai
Sportspeople from Krasnodar Krai
Living people
Russian footballers
Russia under-21 international footballers
Association football midfielders
FC Spartak Moscow players
FC Kuban Krasnodar players
FC Rubin Kazan players
FC Arsenal Tula players
FC Akhmat Grozny players
FC Ural Yekaterinburg players
Russian Premier League players
Russian First League players
Russian Second League players